The Indian cricket team toured the West Indies for a four-match Test series. Prior to the four Test matches, there were two tour matches. The tour coincided with the 2016 Caribbean Premier League. This was the first bilateral tour between the two sides since the West Indies pulled out of the previous tour in October 2014.

In July 2016 the Board of Control for Cricket in India (BCCI) met with West Indies Cricket Board (WICB) to look at the possibility of adding three Twenty20 International (T20I) matches to the tour. The WICB requested that the matches could be played at the Central Broward Regional Park in Florida at the end of August. The West Indies previously played T20I matches in the United States against New Zealand in June 2012. There were fears that it may have taken up to six weeks to secure visas for the Indian team, but both the BCCI and WICB secured them in time. On 2 August, the BCCI confirmed that there would be two T20I matches played in Florida at the end of August.

India won the Test series 2–0 and the West Indies won the T20I series 1–0.

Squads

Tour matches

Two-day: WICB President's XI v Indians

Three-day: WICB President's XI v Indians

Test series

1st Test

2nd Test

3rd Test

4th Test

T20I series

1st T20I

2nd T20I

References

External links
 Series home at ESPN Cricinfo

2016 in Indian cricket
2016 in West Indian cricket
International cricket competitions in 2016
Indian cricket tours of the West Indies